Paul Kevin Brobson (born November 26, 1970) is an associate justice of the Supreme Court of Pennsylvania. In 2009, he was elected to serve as a judge on the Commonwealth Court of Pennsylvania, where he served until 2022.

Childhood
Brobson was born in Montoursville, Pennsylvania.

Education
Brobson graduated from Lycoming College with a Bachelor of Science in Accounting magna cum laude in 1992 and earned his Juris Doctor from Widener University Commonwealth Law School summa cum laude in 1995.

Legal work experience
Brobson was a law clerk for the Honorable James McGirr Kelly of the United States District Court for the Eastern District of Pennsylvania from 1995 to 1996. He was then an attorney at Buchanan, Ingersoll & Rooney law firm in Pittsburgh, Pennsylvania from 1996 to 2009. In addition to his role as an appellate judge, he served as Widener University Commonwealth Law School jurist-in-residence from 2016 to 2018.

Judicial career
Brobson served on the Commonwealth Court of Pennsylvania from 2010 to 2022. In the 2021 general election, he was the Republican nominee to fill the vacancy on the Supreme Court of Pennsylvania left by the mandatory retirement of Chief Justice Thomas G. Saylor; Brobson narrowly defeated the Democratic nominee, Pennsylvania Superior Court Judge Maria McLaughlin and was sworn in on January 6, 2022.

References 

Widener University Commonwealth Law School alumni
1970 births
Living people
Judges of the Commonwealth Court of Pennsylvania